Cebu is a 1991 novel by Filipino American author Peter Bacho the "most visible figure" of second-generation, native-born Filipino American writing and one of several Seattle novelists in the 1990s to explore the racial history and sociology of Seattle. The novel is also "the first novel about a Filipino American who identifies primarily with US localities," rather than with the Philippines.

Plot summary

The novel's main character is an American priest named Ben Lucero, who is the son of a Filipino mother and a Filipino American father, as he makes his first trip to the Philippines. When Ben's mother dies, he takes her body to Cebu, Philippines for burial; it is his first trip to his mother's country. In the Philippines, he stays with his mother's best friend from childhood, "Aunt" Clara Natividad, who has become a wealthy and powerful businesswoman but led guerilla fighters during the war and earned her fortune through ethically questionable business practices. The novel follows Ben's encounters with Philippine culture and tradition, both in Cebu City and in Manila, where he spends time with Clara's assistant Ellen but also sees the violence around him, such as a protest at the U.S. Embassy in which Philippine soldiers attacked their own people. Unnerved by his experiences in Manila, Ben returns home to Seattle, where he finds himself caught up in an escalating cycle of violence within the Filipino immigrant community. Ben is confused by his experiences, feeling like an outsider in both his mother's homeland and his own local community.

Prologue: Ben's arrival in the Philippines and reunion with Aunt Clara

Part 1: The history of Clara's friendship with Ben's mother, Remedios; how Clara became wealthy, how she rescued Remedios from the Japanese, and how Remedios married Ben's father, Albert, and moved to the States.

Part 2: The story of Clara's friend Carlito as he tries to save his daughter through personal sacrifice; more on Clara's history during the War.

Part 3: The discovery of Carlito's actions.

Part 4: Ben's stay with Ellen in Manila as he waits for a flight back to the States

Part 5: Ben's return to Seattle and resumption of his priestly duties, which involve a series of killings in the immigrant community.

Characters in "Cebu"

Ben Lucero
Remedios Lucero
Albert Lucero

In the Philippines
"Aunt" Clara Natividad
Ellen Labrado
Marites
Carlito
Sitoy

In Seattle
Teddy
Johnny Romero: a local cop who works in Ben's section of town; he is half-Filipino and half-Native American, and although he is raised Filipino, he uses his Native American ancestry to get a college degree and government money; he illustrates the impossibility of pinning minorities to either "Filipino" or "white," and he exemplifies the ways minority groups get ranked in a hierarchy of importance and/or respect
Carmen "Zorro" Gamboa: a Mexican girl who moves into Ben's neighborhood while they are still in school; Teddy calls her Zorro because she has facial hair, and the nickname becomes popular with the schoolkids; only Ben is friendly with her, but she is upset to find out that he is not romantically interested in her; when she dies a few months later after getting involved with a "bad crowd," Ben blames himself until he finds out that she came from a bad home and was all but destined for a bad life

Major themes

The novel features themes around the differences between American and Philippine culture and between American and Philippine Roman Catholicism. Other themes covered include the history of the Philippines from the final days of World War II, the effect of American presence in the country, and the difference between American-born Filipinos and Filipino immigrants.  The Philippine concept of barkada, a notion of loyalty to one's peer group, plays an important role in his experiences in Seattle after his return.

Literary significance and reception
It is often discussed in scholarly surveys of Filipino American literature, alongside such seminal works as Carlos Bulosan's America Is in the Heart and Jessica Hagedorn's Dogeaters.

Allusions and references

Allusions to actual history, geography and current science
Besides the descriptions of life in Cebu City and Manila, the novel refers to the general history of the Philippines from the time of Japanese control to the beginning of the revolt against the Marcos regime, including the student protests at American Embassy in 1970.

Awards and nominations
The novel won the American Book Award from the Before Columbus Foundation.

Publication history
1991, USA, U of Washington P , Pub date November 1991, hardback and paperback

Sources, references, external links, quotations

1991 American novels
Filipino-American novels
Novels set in Seattle
Novels set in the Philippines
Culture of Cebu
American Book Award-winning works